Hull General Cemetery was established by a private company in 1847 on Spring Bank (now Spring Bank W.) in the west of Kingston upon Hull, East Riding of Yorkshire, England. In 1862 the Hull Corporation established a cemetery adjacent, now known as Western Cemetery, and in  expanded the cemetery west across Chanterlands Avenue onto an adjacent site.

The General Cemetery contains several notable monument and burials, including a monument to a cholera outbreak in 1849, as well as the graves of many notable persons of the Victoria era and early 20th century of Kingston upon Hull. The General Cemetery closed in 1972, the Western Cemetery is, as of 2018, still in use.

In 2018, a community group of volunteers, The Friends of Hull General Cemetery, was formed and have taken on the challenge of caring for this heritage site of special natural interest. The group was formed as a subcommittee of the Hull Civic Society. It meets regularly at the Avenues Centre, Park Avenue, Hull. During its short life it has generated a significant amount of interest in the cemetery from the general public and plans are afoot to bid for local and national funding to make the cemetery a more hospitable place for the community to visit yet still retain its historical significance and environmental importance for future generations.

In September 2018 a short introduction to the Hull General Cemetery 1847–1972, was published by Pete Lowden and Bill Longbone

History

Hull General Cemetery

Hull General Cemetery Company was established in 1846, with a capital of 1,000 shares of £10. The cemetery on Spring Bank was opened in 1847, for Anglican burials only, with the foundation stone of the cemetery's entrance lodge formally laid by the mayor, B.M. Jalland on 2 June. The ground was consecrated on 28 August 1847. In 1859 the foundation stone for the cemetery's chapel was laid, by the mayor, Martin Samuelson. The cemetery entrance was in  a gothic revival style, consisting of three lodges and six large double gates; the original mortuary chapel was octagonal, a second chapel was later added exclusively for Anglican rites, and a third in 1863 for the use of non-conformists. At the time of its development the cemetery was in the parish of Cottingham, and on the outer fringes of the urban development of Hull.

In 1854 an act allowed incorporation of the company, and allowed it to expand. Intramural burial were abolished in Hull after 1856/7. In 1855 Quakers took a 999-year lease on a plot of ground within the cemetery. Several prominent Quakers were later buried in the ground including persons from the prominent local employers of the Reckitt, and Priestmann families.

The main gates were demolished in the early 20th century, and built over. The Hull General Cemetery went into receivership in the 1970s, and maintenance of the cemetery was taken over by Hull City Council. The final interment was in 1972, excluding the Quaker burial ground which had its last burial in 1974. The overgrown cemetery was cleared after being taken over by the council in 1972. The main gates, and all the chapels had been demolished by 1983.

The Hull General Cemetery Company sought liquidation via the courts which it achieved in 1972 leaving the site without ownership. Eventually, after questions asked in Parliament the site was sold to Hull City Council for a nominal sum of £1 in 1974.

Public opposition to a plan for renovating Hull General Cemetery, backed by notable persons such as Philip Larkin and John Betjeman, was overruled. The whole process took about 18 months. Due to Hull General Cemetery’s conspicuous role in Victorian Hull, a number of headstones, principally of more notable members of the public, were allowed to remain.

Conclusion 
The Friends of Hull General Cemetery are actively working to create an oasis for the community in the heart of the city. The Friends of Hull General Cemetery Facebook group was formed to promote and celebrate the unique historical and environmental attributes of the cemetery. It is the ‘Friends’ intention to try to turn this long-overgrown and disused burial ground into a place which can once more be enjoyed by all in the local neighbourhood. The 'Friends' hope to achieve this over time by clearing up the graves and headstones, by encouraging the diversity of flora and wildlife, by promoting historical research, and most importantly of all by getting and keeping local people and organisations involved in its upkeep.

Notable graves and monuments

 Monument to the victims of the 1849 cholera epidemic, erected through private contributions. Around 700 victims were buried in the cemetery.
 William Clowes, d. 1851, Methodist.
 Joseph Beaumont, d. 1855, Weslyan preacher.
 Count de Werdinsky, d. 1856, supposed displaced Polish nobleman, probable serial fraudster and criminal.
 Cast Iron monument in the style of an Eleanor Cross (listed structure).
 Isaac Reckitt, d. 1862, Quaker, founder of Reckitt and Sons.
 Henry Blundell, d. 1865, founder of the paint company Blundell Spence and Company.
 Monument to John Gravill, d. , captain of the ill-fated whaling ship Diana.
 Thomas Wilson, d. 1869, shipping magnate.
 Thomas Earle, d. 1873, sculptor.
 Henry Redmore, d. 1887, artist.
 Monument to John Rylands (d. 1888). (buried in Southern Cemetery, Manchester.)
 James Reckitt, d. 1922, Quaker, philanthropist, also of Reckitt and Sons.
 William Dent Priestman, d. 1936, Quaker, oil engineer pioneer, founder of Priestman Brothers
 Family and wife of Albert Kaye Rollit, mayor of Hull, politician and lawyer.

Hull Western Cemetery

 of land had been set aside by the Hull General Cemetery for use of the board of health (1859), and in 1862 the board acquired the land, opening a new cemetery adjacent west of the old General Cemetery, known as the Western Cemetery.  A chapel was later added for Anglican rites, and a third in 1863 for the use of non-conformists. By 1892 the Western Cemetery occupied .

In  the cemetery was expanded westwards, with additional land on the opposite side of Chanterlands Avenue, a further mortuary chapel was built in the extension. As of 1995 all the cemetery's chapels had been demolished.

As of 2018 the Western Cemetery is in still use.

Notable graves and monuments
 A monument to those killed in the R38 Airship disaster over the Humber Estuary.
 Memorials to Captain George Henry Smith, and to William Richard Leggert, both killed in the Dogger Bank incident.
 John Cunningham, Victoria Cross recipient, 1916

 The cemetery contains the war graves of 493 Commonwealth service personnel, 393 from the First World War and 100 from the Second World War.

Gallery

Notes

References

Sources

Landmarks and map locations

External links

 CWGC: Hull Western Cemetery
 The Friends of Hull General Cemetery
 Further reading about the Hull General Cemetery
 

Cemeteries in Kingston upon Hull
Commonwealth War Graves Commission cemeteries in England